Lehrke Inlet is an ice-filled inlet,  wide, which recedes southwest for  between Cape Boggs and Cape Sharbonneau, along the east coast of Palmer Land, Antarctica.

Dawson Head is located along the northwest side of the inlet.

References

Inlets of Palmer Land